The 1952 season was the forty-first season for Santos FC.

References

External links
Official Site 

Santos
1952
1952 in Brazilian football